Cyclophora maderensis is a moth in the  family Geometridae. It is found on the Canary Islands and Madeira.

The wingspan is 18–25 mm. The forewings are ochreous, finely and densely irrorated with rough pinkish scales. There is a central waved band with a grey hue and a paler ochre subterminal line. The hindwings are also ochreous.

The larvae feed on Erica species, including Erica arborea.

Subspecies
Cyclophora maderensis maderensis (Madeira)
Cyclophora maderensis trilineata (Prout, 1934) (Canary Islands)

References

Moths described in 1891
Cyclophora (moth)
Moths of Africa